Máncora is a 2008 Peruvian-Spanish drama film directed by Peruvian director Ricardo de Montreuil. The film premiered as an official selection at the 2008 Sundance Film Festival.

Synopsis
From the director of La mujer de mi hermano and the writer of Voces inocentes comes Máncora, a road-trip drama that traces the shifting emotional boundaries between three disconnected individuals.

Máncora begins with Santiago (Jason Day), a 21-year-old from Lima who is disturbed by his father's recent and unexpected suicide. Wanting to leave the chill of a grey Lima winter, Santiago decides to go to Máncora, a beach town in the north of the country where the climate is warmer. Right before his departure, Santiago receives an unexpected visit from his stepsister Ximena (Elsa Pataky), an energetic Spanish photographer and her husband Iñigo (Enrique Murciano), an art collector from New York. Their peaceful getaway is quickly disrupted by an act of boundary-crossing and betrayal, which might change their relationship forever.

Reception 
On Rotten Tomatoes it has a rating of 33% based on 6 reviews.

Festivals 
 Official Selection Sundance Film Festival 2008
 Official Selection Edinburgh International Film Festival 2008
 Official Selection Mill Valley Film Festival 2008
 Official Selection Stockholm International Film Festival 2008
 Official Selection São Paulo International Film Festival 2008
 Official Selection AFI Latin American Film Festival 2008
 Official Selection Seattle International Film Festival 2008
 Winner Best Supporting Actor Ibiza International Film Festival 2008
 Official Selection New York International Latino Film Festival 2008
 Official Selection Bergen International Film Festival 2008
 Official Selection Los Angeles Latino International Film Festival 2008

References

External links
 
 Bottom Line: A taut, stylish drama.
 Peru—MÁNCORA

2008 films
2008 drama films
2008 independent films
2000s Peruvian films
Adultery in films
Films directed by Ricardo de Montreuil
Films set in Peru
Films shot in Peru
Peruvian drama films
Spanish drama films
Spanish independent films